HMS Faversham was a Hunt class minesweeper of the Royal Navy from World War I.

See also
 Faversham

References
 

 

Hunt-class minesweepers (1916)
1918 ships